Lachnaia caprai is a species of leaf beetles from the subfamily Cryptocephalinae. It is native to Sicily.

References

Clytrini
Beetles described in 1958